Infravia Capital Partners is an investment company based in Paris. 

It acquired a large stake in Next Generation Data, based in Newport, Wales for about  £100 million in 2016, and two Swiss data center businesses, Green.ch and Green Datacenter, from Altice in 2017.

It bought the Mater Private Hospital for about €500 million in 2018.

It is a majority shareholder in Cignal, a telecommunications infrastructure provider in Ireland. It also has interests in the Irish nursing home sector.

It is part of a joint venture with Liberty Global and Telefónica to build a new fibre network in the UK covering up to 7 million homes.

References

Investment management companies of France